The 2004 Sydney to Hobart Yacht Race, sponsored by Rolex, was the 60th annual running of the "blue water classic" Sydney to Hobart Yacht Race. As in past editions of the race, it was hosted by the Cruising Yacht Club of Australia based in Sydney, New South Wales. The 2004 race began on Sydney Harbour at 1:10pm on Boxing Day (26 December 2004), before heading south for 630 nautical miles (1,170 km) through the Tasman Sea, past Bass Strait, into Storm Bay and up the River Derwent, to cross the finish line in Hobart, Tasmania.

The 2004 fleet comprised 116 starters of which 59 completed the race and 57 yachts retired. This was the last starting fleet over 100 until the 2014 race. The poor weather, the worst since the deadly 1998 race, forced 42 boats to withdraw from the race by the second day.

Results

Line Honours results (Top 10)

Handicap results (Top 10)

References

Sydney to Hobart Yacht Race
S
2004 in Australian sport
December 2004 sports events in Australia
January 2005 sports events in Australia